{{Speciesbox
| status = DD
| status_system = IUCN3.1
| taxon = Boana stenocephala
| authority = (Caramaschi & Cruz, 1999)
| synonyms = * Hypsiboas stenocephalus (Caramaschi & Cruz, 1999)
|status_ref=
}}Boana stenocephala'' is a species of frog in the family Hylidae that is endemic to Brazil. Its natural habitats are moist savanna and rivers. It is threatened by habitat loss.

References
 

Boana
Endemic fauna of Brazil
Amphibians described in 1999
Taxonomy articles created by Polbot